Nathaniel Bentley (–1809), commonly known as Dirty Dick, was an 18th and 19th-century merchant who owned a hardware shop and warehouse in London. He was possibly an inspiration for Miss Havisham in Charles Dickens' Great Expectations, after he refused to wash following the death of his fiancée on their wedding day.

A pub he owned in Bishopsgate Without, in the City of London, was later named for him.

History
Bentley had been quite a dandy in his youth, earning the nickname the Beau of Leadenhall Street, but following the death of his fiancée on their wedding day he refused to wash or clean and for the rest of his life lived in squalor. His house and warehouse shop became so filthy that he became a celebrity of dirt. Any letter addressed to "The dirty Warehouse, London" was delivered to him. He stopped trading in 1804. He died at Haddington about 1809, and was buried in Aubourn parish church. The warehouse was later demolished.

Pub
A pub on the east side of the road Bishopsgate, in the Bishopsgate Without area, which Bentley had once owned, changed its name from The Old Jerusalem to Dirty Dick's, and recreated the look of Bentley's warehouse shop.

The contents, including cobwebs and dead cats from the original warehouse, were originally a part of the cellar bar, but have now been tidied to a glass display case.  Successive owners of the Bishopsgate distillery and its tap capitalized on the legend.  By the end of the nineteenth century, its owner, a public house company called William Barker's (D.D.) Ltd., was producing commemorative booklets and promotional material to advertise the pub. The pub had to undergo a degree of deep cleansing in the 1980s in order to comply with health and safety legislation.

The pub is now owned by Young's.

See also
 Amou Haji – an Iranian hermit who avoided soap and water for over 65 years

References

External links
 

1735 births
1809 deaths
18th-century English businesspeople
19th-century English businesspeople
Merchants from London
Pubs in the City of London